Dr Shiv Kumar Rai is an Indian journalist-turned-entrepreneur, who is the founder of FOURTH VOICE MEDIA NETWORK and Editor-in- Chief of POINT OUT magazine. Dr Rai, is an eminent author and columnist with over two decades of experience in leading media houses. He is a winner of the prestigious Bhartendu Harishchandra Award2010 for his book, ‘Meri Jaati Bhartiya’, conferred by the Ministry of Information & Broadcasting, Government of India.

Dr Rai regularly writes commentaries on issues of national interest in leading publications. He had a humble beginning in the print media, where he worked for industry leader such as ‘Nava Bharat’ and ‘Dainik Jagran’. He then switched over to take on the challenge of electronic media and worked with ‘Zee News’ by anchoring daily prime-time news shows, and went on to work with top news channels like ‘Aaj Tak’ and ‘Doordarshan’. Besides anchoring, Dr Rai has also produced a variety of current affairs programmes for various prominent television news channels.

Education 

Rai has a Master of Arts degree in Social Science.

Doctor of Philosophy awarded by Barkatullah University, Bhopal for research on the subject ‘Suicide in Bhopal City: A sociological study’. This study was first of its kind in Madhya Pradesh.

Associated with Indian Institute of Advance Studies, Shimla for research on Suicide.

Research on occupational mobility among slum dwellers of Bhopal, Madhya Pradesh.

Presented paper in 22nd All India Sociological Conference in the year 1995.

Career 

Rai started his career as a reporter on a regional newspaper based in Madhya Pradesh.

He was a prime time News Anchor with Zee News. Rai also worked with Doordarshan, Voice of India, Aaj Tak, and the Navabharat.

As of 2014, he is a columnist for Dainik Jagran, Swatantra Vartha, Amar Ujala, as well as for other Indian newspapers.

Fourth Voice Media Network 

In 2011 Rai established FOURTH VOICE MEDIA NETWORK (POINT OUT GROUP), an Indian Media Company based in New Delhi, with a formidable reputation in the PRINT MEDIA, FILM & TELEVISION PROGRAMME.  its motto is to give voice to issues that concern everyone.

Personal life 
Rai is based in New Delhi, India. He lives with his family.

Publications 

 Meri Jati Bharatiya — winner of the Bhartendu Harishchandra Award conferred by the Ministry of Information and Broadcasting.

Awards 

 BHARTENDU HARISHCHANDRA AWARD 2010 for his Manuscript 'Meri Jati Bharatiya’ 
 "State Young Scientist award 1998, from Department of Science & Technology, Govt. of India and Madhya Pradesh Council of Science & Technology, Govt. of Madhya Pradesh"

External links 
 http://www.fourthvoicemedianetwork.com/
 http://drshivkumar.in/

References

 https://www.youtube.com/watch?v=o8lHPJa2TaM
 https://www.amazon.in/s/ref=dp_byline_sr_book_1?ie=UTF8&field-author=Dr.Shiv+kumar+Rai&search-alias=stripbooks
 http://www.firstpost.com/topic/person/vasundhara-raje-dr-shiv-kumar-rai-with-vasundhara-raje-video-r2djD8UM8EY-92685-2.html
 http://www.firstpost.com/topic/person/vasundhara-raje-dr-shiv-kumar-rai-with-cp-joshi-video-s1h9QmDTHgA-92685-8.html
 http://pib.nic.in/newsite/erelease.aspx?relid=79256

Barkatullah University alumni
Indian columnists
Indira Gandhi National Open University alumni
Living people
Year of birth missing (living people)